Pike's Groove is an album led by vibraphonist Dave Pike which was recorded in 1986 and released by the Criss Cross Jazz label.

Reception

The AllMusic review by Scott Yanow states "Vibraphonist Dave Pike has recorded in a variety of settings through the years. His Criss Cross date is one of his finest straight-ahead outings ... Highly recommended".

Track listing
 "Big Foot" (Charlie Parker) – 4:13
 "Spring Can Really Hang You Up the Most" (Tommy Wolf, Fran Landesman) – 5:49
 "You're My Everything" (Harry Warren, Mort Dixon, Joe Young) – 3:42
 "Ornithology" (Parker, Benny Harris) – 6:33
 "Con Alma" (Dizzy Gillespie) – 6:49
 "Reflections in Blue" (Dave Pike) – 8:28
 "Birk's Works" (Gillespie) – 6:06
 "You're My Everything" [alternate take] (Warren, Dixon, Young) – 5:31 Additional track on CD reissue	
 "Big Foot" [alternate take] (Parker) – 4:32 Additional track on CD reissue

Personnel
Dave Pike – vibraphone
Cedar Walton − piano
David Williams − bass
Billy Higgins - drums

References

Dave Pike albums
1986 albums
Criss Cross Jazz albums